Evripides Demosthenous (Greek: Ευριπίδης Δημοσθένους; born 14 October 1972) is a retired Cypriot sprinter who specialised in the 400 metres. He represented his country at two Summer Olympics, in 1996 and 2000, as well as three consecutive World Championships, starting in 1995.

He has personal bests of 46.16 seconds outdoors (Palma de Mallorca 1999) and 47.39 seconds indoors (Piraeus 1998). Both are standing national records.

Competition record

References

1972 births
Living people
Cypriot male sprinters
Athletes (track and field) at the 1996 Summer Olympics
Athletes (track and field) at the 2000 Summer Olympics
Olympic athletes of Cyprus
Athletes (track and field) at the 1994 Commonwealth Games
Athletes (track and field) at the 1998 Commonwealth Games
Commonwealth Games competitors for Cyprus
Competitors at the 1993 Mediterranean Games
Mediterranean Games competitors for Cyprus